La Iguana Bridge is a pedestrian bridge in Puerto Vallarta, in the Mexican state of Jalisco.

Description and history
The bridge was completed in 2012 and connects Cuauhtémoc Street in Gringo Gulch, Centro, to Isla Cuale in Zona Romántica. The bridge was inspired by and named after the animal of the same name. The metallic handrails are painted white. The main steps are made of concrete and sand and in the middle there are steps that emerge and that are covered with green and yellow tiles.

References

External links

 

2012 establishments in Mexico
Bridges completed in 2012
Bridges in Mexico
Centro, Puerto Vallarta
Footbridges
Zona Romántica
Buildings and structures in Puerto Vallarta